The Blank Page is a crime novel by the American writer K. C. Constantine set in 1970s Rocksburg, a fictional, blue-collar, Rust Belt town in Western Pennsylvania (modeled on the author's hometown of McKees Rocks, Pennsylvania, adjacent to Pittsburgh).

Plot
Mario Balzic is the protagonist, an atypical detective for the genre, a Serbo-Italian American cop, middle-aged, unpretentious, a family man who asks questions and uses more sense than force.

As the novel opens, it is a record-hot Memorial Day  when Miss Cynthia Summer calls Police Chief Mario Balzic to say that she hadn't seen one of her student roomers. Balzic discovers Janet Pisula's body on the floor of her room, a blank sheet of typing paper on her stomach.....

It is the third book in the 17-volume Rocksburg series.

References

1974 American novels
American crime novels
Novels by K. C. Constantine
Novels set in Pennsylvania
Saturday Review Press books